Helping Henry was a United Kingdom Channel 4 children's television programme, which ran for one series of thirteen 15-minute episodes in 1988. Designed as an educational show, it featured a young boy named Stephen explaining how things worked to an alien named N-3 (or "Henry"), who was disguised as a dining-room chair because his superiors believed that static four legged things were clearly a superior species to the 'two legs' who bustled about them. "Henry" was designed and built by Fluck and Law, creators of puppets for Spitting Image, and voiced by Jeremy Hardy.

The series was created and written by Chips Hardy and John Henderson. One of the additional writers was Peter Algate.

External links 

1988 British television series debuts
1988 British television series endings
1980s British children's television series
Channel 4 original programming
British children's science fiction television series
1980s British television miniseries
British television shows featuring puppetry
English-language television shows